Arthur Rose Vincent CBE (9 June 1876 – 24 September 1956) was an Irish politician and barrister. He also served as a judge of various British colonial and extraterritorial courts.  Together with his parents-in-law, he donated Muckross House and its estate to the Irish state.

Early life
Vincent was born into an Anglo-Irish family based in Summerhill House in Clonlara, County Clare. His parents were Colonel Arthur Hare Vincent (1840–1916) and Elizabeth Rose Davidson-Manson (1844–1879).

Vincent was born in Mhow, Madhya Pradesh, India, where his father commanded the 3rd The King's Own Hussars. He left there by the time he was three and never went back to India.

Vincent was educated at Wellington College, Berkshire, College de France, Paris and at Trinity College, Dublin. He graduated with a Bachelor of Laws and qualified as Barrister-at-Law with King's Inns, Dublin.

Judicial career
In 1903, Vincent joined the Foreign Office Judicial service.  In that year, he was appointed Magistrate in Kisumu, British East Africa.  In 1905, he appointed Second Assistant Judge in Zanzibar. With effect from April 1906, he was appointed Assistant Judge for the British Court for Siam in Bangkok.  In 1908, he was appointed Acting Assistant Judge of the British Supreme Court for China and Corea in Shanghai while the Judge of the Court Havilland de Sausmarez was on sick leave. He served in that position for one year.  He met his future wife travelling from Shanghai to San Francisco.  He returned to Zanzibar as Acting Assistant Judge briefly from October 1909 to January 1910, when he resigned from Foreign Office service.

Later life

He served as High Sheriff of County Kerry in 1915 and as a justice of the peace.

In 1919, Vincent, who was then serving as the Chicago Representative of the Ministry of Information, was appointed a Commander of the Order of the British Empire.

Vincent was an independent member of Seanad Éireann from 1931 to 1934. He was elected at a by-election on 28 May 1931 taking the seat vacated by the death of Patrick W. Kenny. He was re-elected in 1931 for 9 years. He resigned on 21 February 1934 due to reasons of ill-health. Patrick Lynch was elected at a by-election to replace him.

In 1932, finding the management and expense of the Muckross estate too difficult and too expensive, Vincent and his parents-in-law Mr and Mrs William Bowers Bourn donated Muckross House and its 11,000 acres estate to the Irish state as a memorial to Maud Bourn Vincent. It now forms part of Killarney National Park. In 1937 he left Ireland for Monaco, where he lived for most of the rest of his life. Only during World War II did he come back to Ireland. He is buried in the Killegy graveyard near Muckross House.

Marriages
Vincent married Maud Bowers Bourn, the daughter of William Bowers Bourn in 1910. They had two children, Elizabeth Rose (1915–1983) and Arthur William Bourn (1919–2012). After Maud's death from pneumonia in 1929, Vincent married Dorothy Lavinia Emily Hughes (née Croutear) (1896–1988) in 1933.

References

External links
 ″Billy on Billy″ by Maurice Hayes, 2004
 ″One of the Nicest Guys″ by Anne and Bill MCNally, 2012

1876 births
1956 deaths
Independent members of Seanad Éireann
Irish barristers
Members of the 1928 Seanad
Members of the 1931 Seanad
High Sheriffs of Kerry
Politicians from County Kerry
British extraterritorial judges
Irish expatriates in Monaco
Alumni of King's Inns
Irish people in colonial India